Midway is the name of some places in the U.S. state of Pennsylvania:

Midway, Adams County, Pennsylvania, a census-designated place
Midway, Berks County, Pennsylvania
Midway, Washington County, Pennsylvania, a borough